Gustavo Torrijos (born 23 September 1962) is a Spanish former breaststroke swimmer who competed in the 1980 Summer Olympics.

References

1962 births
Living people
Spanish male breaststroke swimmers
Olympic swimmers of Spain
Swimmers at the 1980 Summer Olympics